Pessimism is a negative mental attitude in which an undesirable outcome is anticipated from a given situation. Pessimists tend to focus on the negatives of life in general. A common question asked to test for pessimism is "Is the glass half empty or half full?"; in this situation, a pessimist is said to see the glass as half empty, while an optimist is said to see the glass as half full. Throughout history, the pessimistic disposition has had effects on all major areas of thinking.

Etymology
The term pessimism derives from the Latin word pessimus meaning 'the worst'. It was first used by Jesuit critics of Voltaire's 1759 novel Candide, ou l'Optimisme. Voltaire was satirizing the philosophy of Leibniz who maintained that this was the 'best (optimum) of all possible worlds'. In their attacks on Voltaire, the Jesuits of the Revue de Trévoux accused him of pessimisme.

As a psychological disposition
In the ancient world, psychological pessimism was associated with melancholy, and was believed to be caused by an excess of black bile in the body. The study of pessimism has parallels with the study of depression. Psychologists trace pessimistic attitudes to emotional pain or even biology. Aaron Beck argues that depression is due to unrealistic negative views about the world. Beck starts treatment by engaging in conversation with clients about their unhelpful thoughts. Pessimists, however, are often able to provide arguments that suggest that their understanding of reality is justified; as in Depressive realism or (pessimistic realism). Deflection is a common method used by those who are depressed. They let people assume they are revealing everything which proves to be an effective way of hiding. The pessimism item on the Beck Depression Inventory has been judged useful in predicting suicides. The Beck Hopelessness Scale has also been described as a measurement of pessimism.

Wender and Klein point out that pessimism can be useful in some circumstances: "If one is subject to a series of defeats, it pays to adopt a conservative game plan of sitting back and waiting and letting others take the risks. Such waiting would be fostered by a pessimistic outlook. Similarly if one is raking in the chips of life, it pays to adopt an expansive risk-taking approach, and thus maximize access to scarce resources."

Criticism

Pragmatic criticism 
Through history, some have concluded that a pessimistic attitude, although justified, must be avoided to endure. Optimistic attitudes are favored and of emotional consideration. Al-Ghazali and William James rejected their pessimism after suffering psychological, or even psychosomatic illness. Criticisms of this sort however assume that pessimism leads inevitably to a mood of darkness and utter depression. Many philosophers would disagree, claiming that the term "pessimism" is being abused. The link between pessimism and nihilism is present, but the former does not necessarily lead to the latter, as philosophers such as Albert Camus believed. Happiness is not inextricably linked to optimism, nor is pessimism inextricably linked to unhappiness. One could easily imagine an unhappy optimist, and a happy pessimist. Accusations of pessimism may be used to silence legitimate criticism. 

The economist Nouriel Roubini was largely dismissed as a pessimist, for his dire but to some extent accurate predictions of a coming global financial crisis, in 2006. However, financial journalist Justin Fox observed in the Harvard Business Review in 2010 that "In fact, Roubini didn't exactly predict the crisis that began in mid-2007... Roubini spent several years predicting a very different sort of crisis—one in which foreign central banks diversifying their holdings out of Treasuries sparked a run on the dollar—only to turn in late 2006 to warning of a U.S. housing bust and a global 'hard landing'. He still didn't give a perfectly clear or (in retrospect) accurate vision of how exactly this would play out... I'm more than a little weirded out by the status of prophet that he has been accorded since." Others noted that "The problem is that even though he was spectacularly right on this one, he went on to predict time and time again, as the markets and the economy recovered in the years following the collapse, that there would be a follow-up crisis and that more extreme crashes were inevitable. His calls, after his initial pronouncement, were consistently wrong. Indeed, if you had listened to him, and many investors did, you would have missed the longest bull market run in US market history." Another observed: "For a prophet, he's wrong an awful lot of the time." Tony Robbins wrote: "Roubini warned of a recession in 2004 (wrongly), 2005 (wrongly), 2006 (wrongly), and 2007 (wrongly)" ... and he "predicted (wrongly) that there'd be a 'significant' stock market correction in 2013." Speaking about Roubini, economist Anirvan Banerjee told The New York Times: "Even a stopped clock is right twice a day." Economist Nariman Behravesh said: "Nouriel Roubini has been singing the doom-and-gloom story for 10 years. Eventually something was going to be right."

Personality Plus opines that pessimistic temperaments (e.g. melancholy and phlegmatic) can be useful inasmuch as pessimists' focus on the negative helps them spot problems that people with more optimistic temperaments (e.g. choleric and sanguine) miss.

Other forms of pessimism

Philosophical pessimism 

Philosophical pessimism is not a state of mind or a psychological disposition, but rather it is a worldview or philosophical position that assigns a negative value to life or existence. Philosophical pessimists commonly argue that the world contains an empirical prevalence of pains over pleasures, that existence is ontologically or metaphysically adverse to living beings, and that life is fundamentally meaningless or without purpose.

Epistemological 
There are several theories of epistemology which could arguably be said to be pessimistic in the sense that they consider it difficult or even impossible to obtain knowledge about the world. These ideas are generally related to nihilism, philosophical skepticism and relativism.

Friedrich Heinrich Jacobi (1743–1819), analyzed rationalism, and in particular Immanuel Kant's "critical" philosophy to carry out a reductio ad absurdum according to which all rationalism reduces to nihilism, and thus it should be avoided and replaced with a return to some type of faith and revelation.

Richard Rorty, Michel Foucault, and Ludwig Wittgenstein questioned whether our particular concepts could relate to the world in any absolute way and whether we can justify our ways of describing the world as compared with other ways. In general, these philosophers argue that truth was not about getting it right or representing reality, but was part of subjective social relations of power, or language-games that served our purposes in a particular time. Therefore, these forms of anti-foundationalism, while not being pessimistic per se, reject any definitions that claim to have discovered absolute 'truths' or foundational facts about the world as valid.

Political and cultural 

Philosophical pessimism stands opposed to the optimism or even utopianism of Hegelian philosophies. Emil Cioran claimed "Hegel is chiefly responsible for modern optimism. How could he have failed to see that consciousness changes only its forms and modalities, but never progresses?" Philosophical pessimism is differentiated from other political philosophies by having no ideal governmental structure or political project, rather pessimism generally tends to be an anti-systematic philosophy of individual action. This is because philosophical pessimists tend to be skeptical that any politics of social progress can actually improve the human condition. As Cioran states, "every step forward is followed by a step back: this is the unfruitful oscillation of history". Cioran also attacks political optimism because it creates an "idolatry of tomorrow" which can be used to authorize anything in its name. This does not mean however, that the pessimist cannot be politically involved, as Camus argued in The Rebel.

There is another strain of thought generally associated with a pessimistic worldview, this is the pessimism of cultural criticism and social decline which is seen in Oswald Spengler's The Decline of the West. Spengler promoted a cyclic model of history similar to the theories of Giambattista Vico. Spengler believed modern western civilization was in the 'winter' age of decline (untergang). Spenglerian theory was immensely influential in interwar Europe, especially in Weimar Germany. Similarly, traditionalist Julius Evola thought that the world was in the Kali Yuga, a dark age of moral decline.

Intellectuals like Oliver James correlate economic progress with economic inequality, the stimulation of artificial needs, and affluenza. Anti-consumerists identify rising trends of conspicuous consumption and self-interested, image-conscious behavior in culture. Post-modernists like Jean Baudrillard have even argued that culture (and therefore our lives) now has no basis in reality whatsoever.

Conservative thinkers, especially social conservatives, often perceive politics in a generally pessimistic way. William F. Buckley famously remarked that he was "standing athwart history yelling 'stop! and Whittaker Chambers was convinced that capitalism was bound to fall to communism, though he was himself staunchly anti-communist. Social conservatives often see the West as a decadent and nihilistic civilization which has abandoned its roots in Christianity and/or Greek philosophy, leaving it doomed to fall into moral and political decay. Robert Bork's Slouching Toward Gomorrah and Allan Bloom's The Closing of the American Mind are famous expressions of this point of view.

Many economic conservatives and libertarians believe that the expansion of the state and the role of government in society is inevitable, and they are at best fighting a holding action against it. They hold that the natural tendency of people is to be ruled and that freedom is an exceptional state of affairs which is now being abandoned in favor of social and economic security provided by the welfare state. Political pessimism has sometimes found expression in dystopian novels such as George Orwell's Nineteen Eighty-Four. Political pessimism about one's country often correlates with a desire to emigrate.

During the financial crisis of 2007–08 in the United States, the neologism "pessimism porn" was coined to describe the alleged eschatological and survivalist thrill some people derive from predicting, reading and fantasizing about the collapse of civil society through the destruction of the world's economic system.

Technological and environmental 

Technological pessimism is the belief that advances in science and technology do not lead to an improvement in the human condition. Technological pessimism can be said to have originated during the industrial revolution with the Luddite movement. Luddites blamed the rise of industrial mills and advanced factory machinery for the loss of their jobs and set out to destroy them. The Romantic movement was also pessimistic towards the rise of technology and longed for simpler and more natural times. Poets like William Wordsworth and William Blake believed that industrialization was polluting the purity of nature.

Some social critics and environmentalists believe that globalization, overpopulation and the economic practices of modern capitalist states over-stress the planet's ecological equilibrium. They warn that unless something is done to slow this, climate change will worsen eventually leading to some form of social and ecological collapse. James Lovelock believes that the ecology of the Earth has already been irretrievably damaged, and even an unrealistic shift in politics would not be enough to save it. According to Lovelock, the Earth's climate regulation system is being overwhelmed by pollution and the Earth will soon jump from its current state into a dramatically hotter climate. Lovelock blames this state of affairs on what he calls "polyanthroponemia", which is when: "humans overpopulate until they do more harm than good." Lovelock states:

The presence of 7 billion people aiming for first-world comforts…is clearly incompatible with the homeostasis of climate but also with chemistry, biological diversity and the economy of the system.

Some radical environmentalists, anti-globalization activists, and Neo-luddites can be said to hold to this type of pessimism about the effects of modern "progress". A more radical form of environmental pessimism is anarcho-primitivism which faults the agricultural revolution with giving rise to social stratification, coercion, and alienation. Some anarcho-primitivists promote deindustrialization, abandonment of modern technology and rewilding.

An infamous anarcho-primitivist is Theodore Kaczynski, also known as the Unabomber who engaged in a nationwide mail bombing campaign. In his 1995 Unabomber manifesto, he called attention to the erosion of human freedom by the rise of the modern "industrial-technological system". The manifesto begins thus: The Industrial Revolution and its consequences have been a disaster for the human race. They have greatly increased the life-expectancy of those of us who live in "advanced" countries, but they have destabilized society, have made life unfulfilling, have subjected human beings to indignities, have led to widespread psychological suffering (in the Third World to physical suffering as well) and have inflicted severe damage on the natural world. The continued development of technology will worsen the situation. It will certainly subject human beings to greater indignities and inflict greater damage on the natural world, it will probably lead to greater social disruption and psychological suffering, and it may lead to increased physical suffering even in "advanced" countries.

One of the most radical pessimist organizations is the voluntary human extinction movement which argues for the extinction of the human race through antinatalism.

Pope Francis' controversial 2015 encyclical on ecological issues is rife with pessimistic assessments of the role of technology in the modern world.

Entropy pessimism 

"Entropy pessimism" represents a special case of technological and environmental pessimism, based on thermodynamic principles. According to the first law of thermodynamics, matter and energy is neither created nor destroyed in the economy. According to the second law of thermodynamics—also known as the entropy law—what happens in the economy is that all matter and energy is transformed from states available for human purposes (valuable natural resources) to states unavailable for human purposes (valueless waste and pollution). In effect, all of man's technologies and activities are only speeding up the general march against a future planetary "heat death" of degraded energy, exhausted natural resources and a deteriorated environment—a state of maximum entropy locally on earth; "locally" on earth, that is, when compared to the heat death of the universe, taken as a whole.

The term "entropy pessimism" was coined to describe the work of Romanian American economist Nicholas Georgescu-Roegen, a progenitor in economics and the paradigm founder of ecological economics. Georgescu-Roegen made extensive use of the entropy concept in his magnum opus on The Entropy Law and the Economic Process. Since the 1990s, leading ecological economist and steady-state theorist Herman Daly—a student of Georgescu-Roegen—has been the economic profession's most influential proponent of entropy pessimism.

Among other matters, the entropy pessimism position is concerned with the existential impossibility of allocating Earth's finite stock of mineral resources evenly among an unknown number of present and future generations. This number of generations is likely to remain unknown to us, as there is no way—or only little way—of knowing in advance if or when mankind will ultimately face extinction. In effect, any conceivable intertemporal allocation of the stock will inevitably end up with universal economic decline at some future point.       

Entropy pessimism is a widespread view in ecological economics and in the degrowth movement.

Legal 
Bibas writes that some criminal defense attorneys prefer to err on the side of pessimism: "Optimistic forecasts risk being proven disastrously wrong at trial, an embarrassing result that makes clients angry. On the other hand, if clients plead based on their lawyers' overly pessimistic advice, the cases do not go to trial and the clients are none the wiser."

See also

Notes

Further reading
 Slaboch, Matthew W., A Road to Nowhere: The Idea of Progress and Its Critics, The University of Pennsylvania Press, 2018,

External links

 
 
 Pessimism by Mara Van der Lugt in The Philosopher.

Emotions
Epistemology
Motivation